This is a list of Health ministers of Senegal since the 1960s.

List of ministers 

 1960 : Amadou Boubacar Sarr
 1961 : Amadou Cissé Dia
 1962 : Ibrahima Diallo
 1962-1963 : Demba Coly
 1966-1968 : Abdoulaye Ly
 1970-1972 : Daouda Sow
 1973-1974 : Coumba Ndoffène Diouf
 1975 : Matar Ndiaye
 1975-1978 : Doudou Ngom
 1985 : Mamadou Diop
 1986 : Thierno Ba
 1986-1987 Marie Sarr Mbodj (première femme)
 1988-1990 : Thérèse King
 1990-1995 : Assane Diop
 1995-1998 : Ousmane Ngom
 1998-2000 : Assane Diop
 2001 : Abdou Fall
 2001-2003 : Awa Marie Coll Seck
 2003-2004 : Issa Mbaye Samb
 2004 : Aminata Diallo
 2004-2005 : Issa Mbaye Samb
 2005-2007 : Abdou Fall
 2007 : Issa Mbaye Samb
 2007-April 2009 : Safiatou Thiam
 May 2009-September 2009 : Thèrèse Coumba Diop
 December 2009-April 2012 : Modou Diagne Fada
 April 2012-September 2017 : Awa Marie Coll Seck
 September 2017-May 2022 : Abdoulaye Diouf Sarr
 Since May 2022 : Marie Kermesse Ndom Ndiaye

External links 

 Liste des anciens ministres sur le site Internet du ministère.

Health Minister
Health ministers